The Arfak pygmy bandicoot (Microperoryctes aplini) is a species of marsupial in the family Peramelidae. It is endemic to the Arfak mountains in the Vogelkop Peninsula of West Papua, in Indonesia. Its natural habitat is subtropical or tropical moist montane forests. The population is unknown and threats may be human expansion and hunting but it is protected by Arfak Reserve.

References

Peramelemorphs
Endemic fauna of Indonesia
Marsupials of New Guinea
Mammals of Western New Guinea
Mammals described in 2004
Least concern biota of Oceania